Gary Forero (born 7 August 1979 in Bogotá, Colombia) is a Colombian actor.

Filmography

Telenovelas 
 2018 - Las Muñecas de la mafia 2
 2017 - El Héroe Discreto 
 2011 - Los Canarios
 2010 - El Clon ....Pablo
 2009 - Bella Calamidades ....Fabián Poncela
 2009 - Victorinos ....Rafael Hernández
 2008 - Doña Bárbara ....León Mondragón
 2005 - Juego limpio .........Milton Paniagua

References 

Male actors from Bogotá
Colombian male telenovela actors
Colombian male television actors
1979 births
Living people
20th-century Colombian people